Kosovets, Bulgaria is a village in the municipality of Pomorie, in Burgas Province, in the southeastern part of Bulgaria.

References

Villages in Burgas Province